The State Fair Classic (formerly known as the Southwest Airlines State Fair Classic, for sponsorship purposes) is an annual college football game between the Grambling State University Tigers and the Prairie View A&M University Panthers of the Southwestern Athletic Conference (SWAC). The game is played on a neutral site at the Cotton Bowl in Fair Park, Dallas, Texas during the State Fair of Texas. The game often occurs the weekend before the Red River Showdown game; the Heart of Dallas Classic took place on the first weekend of the 2013 fair, and the State Fair Football Showdown took place on the third weekends of the 2018 and 2019 fairs, featuring SWAC competitors Southern and Texas Southern.

History

Background
The State Fair Classic, held annually at the Cotton Bowl, began in 1925 featuring the Wiley College Wildcats and Langston University Lions. The first game was played on Monday, October 19, 1925 and resulted in a 0–0 tie with neither team scoring before a crowd of 5,000. Both teams met four consecutive years in Dallas before Prairie View replaced Langston in 1929. The contest always took place on "Negro Day" at the State Fair of Texas and would feature the city's black high school football championship in the afternoon followed by the much-anticipated college game at night. An early concept of "Monday Night Football" could also be attributed to the Texas State Fair Classic and Louisiana's own State Fair Classic, as the contests took place on Monday nights from the 1920s into the 1960s.

Wiley wasn't the only college to play PVAMU in the State Fair Classic during that era, as the Panthers battled Tennessee State in 1956 and then Texas Southern until 1959.

Bishop College relocated to Dallas in 1961, eventually taking Wiley's place in the annual contest, in the 43rd annual classic in 1967. From that point, Prairie View A&M maintained a presence in the Cotton Bowl with match-ups against Bishop and others over the years before moving its annual rivalry game against Grambling to the Cotton Bowl stadium in 1985 (the Panthers' series with Grambling had also previously been hosted by the State Fair of Louisiana before returning to on-campus venues in 1962).

With the disbanding of the Prairie View football program in 1990, the State Fair Classic featured Grambling and Elizabeth City State. Even though Prairie View brought football back in 1991, that year Grambling played North Carolina A&T, so it was not until 1992 that the classic would see the PVAMU–GSU showdown once again. Since then, this has been the annual match-up held at the State Fair Classic. Upon the revival of this pairing, Grambling won every game until this changed with the 2009 edition—and the game subsequent to this has been very competitive, with Prairie View winning 9 out of 14 contests between then and 2022. At one point, it was even considered "likely" that Grambling would have to be replaced by Langston for the classic's 2015 edition.

Other events associated with the classic
The classic is accompanied by a pre-game concert featuring a celebrity artist, press conference/fellowship luncheon, pep rallies, alumni fundraising functions, golf tournament, jazz show, comedy show, tailgating, and two battles of the bands. The first battle features high school bands in the Dallas area and the last is between the "World Famed Tiger Marching Band" of Grambling and the "Marching Storm" of Prairie View.

Economic impact
The classic has an annual estimated economic impact of $8.5 million for the City of Dallas. The official 2017 game attendance was 55,231 which solidified the event as one of the largest HBCU football classics in the nation and the largest NCAA Division I Football Championship Subdivision game in Texas. Both schools have a significant portion of their alumni base in the Dallas–Fort Worth metroplex.

Evolving name
Early contests appear to have been informally referred to as the Negro Day game to differentiate it from the state fair's other game, the Red River Showdown. Otherwise, the game is documented as having been called the "State Fair Classic" since at least 1945 and was known exclusively as such through the 1989 season. In 1990, it was renamed the Al Lipscomb State Fair Classic after the former Dallas city councilman. After attracting a title sponsor for 1995, it was rechristened as the Southwest Airlines Al Lipscomb State Fair Classic. Starting with the 2000 season, Lipscomb's name was no longer associated with the game, because he had been convicted of 65 counts of conspiracy and bribery. Promotions with Southwest Airlines listed as the title sponsor ceased after the 2017 game.

Game results

See also

Labor Day Classic
Red River State Fair Classic
List of black college football classics
Southwestern Athletic Conference (SWAC)
Sports in Dallas

References

External links
Official Site

Grambling State Tigers football
Prairie View A&M Panthers football
American football in the Dallas–Fort Worth metroplex
Black college football classics
State Fair of Texas